The Somon Palace, also known as the Palace of the Samanids is a building in Dushanbe, Tajikistan. It is named after named after the Samanid Empire of the 9th-11th centuries. The palace is used for is a place of high-level meetings of the state. It also serves as the residence of the Government of Tajikistan.

Building 
Somon Palace is the largest building at the reserve of the President of Tajikistan. The palace premises cover a total of 22,000 square meters. On the five floors of the building there are numerous representative halls, specially equipped for the holding of major international meetings. Halls in the palace include: the banquet hall, the congress hall, the contract signing room, the negotiation hall and the tête-à-tête hall. The building was developed by the Russian company Art Parquet.

Specific events 

 Navruz celebrations take place inside the palace.
 The 2008 SCO summit was held at Somon Palace.
 Sessions of the Council of Heads of State of the Commonwealth in Dushanbe have been held at the palace.
 Presidential inaugurations of the President of Tajikistan have been held in the palace.

References 

Office buildings in Tajikistan
Event venues in Tajikistan
Buildings and structures in Dushanbe